Federated States of Micronesia competed at the 2015 Pacific Games in Port Moresby, Papua New Guinea from 4 to 18 July 2015. The Federated States of Micronesia listed 44 competitors as of 4 July 2015.

Athletics

The Federated States of Micronesia qualified 6 athletes in track and field

Women
 Lihen H. Jonas

Men
 Pahnrasko Ardos
 Roy Elwise
 Kitson Kapiriel
 Penter Pluhs
 Daniel G. G. Ramngen

Boxing

The Federated States of Micronesia qualified 5 athletes in boxing

Women
 Jennifer Chieng

Men
 Daryll Keller
 Derick-Dean Perman
 Angelo Rodriquez
 Royce Johnson Rott

Football

The Federated States of Micronesia qualified  a men's football team (25 players)

Men
 Aaran J. Bayow
 Devon Figirmow
 Dominic Gadad
 Dominic X. Gadad
 Jonathan Garayog
 Benjamin Gilimoon
 Curtis Graham
 Macarthur James
 Paulis Jeikek
 Mark Jones
 Mark W. Jones
 Ioane Kariti
 Javin W. Kognang
 Mikson Kuka
 Roger Nakasone
 Jacob Nam
 Thomas Nam
 Kacy Alton Olmos
 Walter Francisco Pongkagnang Pengelbew
 Lorenzo Pluhs
 Michael Reyes
 Scott Rudolph
 Ignatius M. Ruwaath
 Jordan M. Ruwetathin
 Franson Simeon

Swimming

The Federated States of Micronesia qualified 2 athletes in swimming

Women
 Debra Daniel

Men
 Dionisio Augustine II

Tennis

The Federated States of Micronesia qualified 2 athletes in tennis

Men
 TJ Rush Apis

Men
 Faaleo Tevaga

Weightlifting

The Federated States of Micronesia qualified 4 athletes in weightlifting:

Men
 Fidelas Falmed
 Manuel Minginfel
 Einstein Perman
 Alvin John G. Ruuemau

References

2015 in Federated States of Micronesia sport
Nations at the 2015 Pacific Games
Federated States of Micronesia at the Pacific Games